The Yes-Men were a high energy rock band from Melbourne Australia formed by Sean Greenway in 1995. Musically the band played a powerful Australian style of rock’n’roll, very close to the pulse of Radio Birdman and Sonic's Rendezvous Band but with a harder edge and more full-on production. Sean Greenway died unexpectedly in January 2001 and with his passing The Yes-Men ceased to exist.

Background

Greenway was pretty much a mainstay of the burgeoning Melbourne underground rock scene in the late 1980s and early 1990s. He started his career as a teenager in Foot and Mouth and then formed God with whom he had much success. God (often stylized as GOD) was a rock 'n' roll band from Melbourne, together from 1986 to 1989 and comprising Joel Silbersher, Tim Hemensley, Sean Greenway and Matthew Whittle.  All members were 15-16 at the time of the band's formation.  Prior to God's formation, Hemensley had been a member of Royal Flush (with Roman Tucker, later of Rocket Science), Greenway and Whittle were members of Foot and Mouth, and Silbersher had his own radio show on 3RRR.

The debut 7" single My Pal by God from 1987 is their best known track.  It got very favourable reviews and sold in the thousands (which was a lot then for an independent band).  It became an independent classic and cover versions have been recorded by several bands, including Magic Dirt, The Hollowmen, Bored!, A Death In The Family and Bum (from Canada).

Following God, Greenway formed the Freeloaders with ex-members of the peripatetic The Philisteins. This lineup of the Freeloaders released a couple of singles through Dog Meat Records before Greenway left in 1995 and began a new project he would eventually call The Yes-Men.

History

Greenway wrote most of the first Yes-Men songs and began recording these songs prior to even having a band to perform them. He recruited Sydney based musician Stewart Leadfinger Cunningham as lead guitarist and began rehearsing and arranging the songs with him during visits to Sydney and when Cunningham was in Melbourne (Cunningham was then playing in Asteroid B-612 and Brother Brick and would visit Melbourne every 6 weeks to play gigs). The first recording sessions for The Yes-Men involved Greenway and long time friend Matthew Whittle(ex-God) laying down bass, guitar and drum tracks at Birdland Studios in Prahran whilst Cunningham would lay down his parts when he was in Melbourne. These earlier recordings would eventually surface on the 2005 posthumous self-titled album 'The Yes-Men' (aka El Peligro Ha Comenzado).

Eventually Mark Hurst (ex- Guttersnipes) was recruited as permanent drummer and Tas Blizzard (Seaweed Gorillas. The Meanies) became the band's first genuine bass player. The addition of these two seasoned musicians solidified the band into a genuine and powerful live band for the first time. This line up recorded the bulk of the Prosody album in fits and spurts through 1997 and 1998 at Birdland studios. Due to the other commitments of the band's members and the fact that Cunningham was based in Sydney the band played live sporadically but managed three trips to Sydney/NSW and regular spots with the Powder Monkeys(who were very generous in their support of the band). The Yes-Men supported The Hellacopters at The Tote Hotel in 1999 with singer Nicke Royale becoming a big fan of The Yes-Men's music. This support led to The Yes-Men's first album Prosody being released in Europe through The Hellacopters White Jazz record label. It is probably fair to say that The Yes-Men are more widely known and loved among European rock fans than in their home country because of this European release and The Hellacopters support.

In late 1998 Jay Curley (ex-The Proton Energy Pills, Tumbleweed) replaced Tas Blizzard on bass and the final tracks (Fawlty Rocks, Fratricide, I Won't Run and Casting Stones) were recorded. The album, titled Prosody was finally finished after almost 4 years of lead up work and sporadic recording. Greenway agreed to have Melbourne record label Stolen Records release the album in Australia on vinyl and CD. White Jazz Records in Sweden would release the album in Europe with the band slated to support the Hellacopters on a Euro tour down the track. The album Prosody was and still is critically acclaimed but fate would step in to thwart the band moving further forward in two ways. The White Jazz label got into legal difficulties and failed to fully support and promote the album. Then on 21 January 2001, the band's leader and founder Sean Greenway died from an accidental heroin dose. It was mocking destiny. Shortly before, the band had begun to collect their first international appreciation thanks to an album, "Prosody" that showed their great skills in writing rough and soulful songs and then it was all over.

A memorial gig was organised for 4 February at the Tote Hotel in Melbourne and the following bands played...The Mystaken, Joel Silbersher and Charlie Owen, The Onyas, The Seminal Rats, The Powder Monkeys, Rocket Science, The Casanovas and The Yes Men with Simon Faulkner of The Splatterheads doin the vocals and Matthew Whittle on guitar. The proceeds of the memorial gig were used to finish off some leftover recordings and eventually a second posthumous album of material was released in 2005 as El Peligro Ha Comenzado on vinyl through Bang! Records and as a self-titled CD album through Butcher's Hook Records.

In 2013 Bang! Records re-issued the now very sought after Prosody album.

Personnel 

Sean Greenway - Vocals/Guitar

Stewart ‘Leadfinger’ Cunningham - Guitar/Backing Vocals

Mark Hurst - Drums

Tasman Blizzard - Bass Guitar (1995-1988)

Jay Curley - Bass Guitar (1998-2000)

Matthew Whittle - Drums/Bass (filled in at various gigs and recording sessions during the band's existence)

Discography
 Prosody, Album 1999 Stolen Records, White Jazz Records
 The Yes-Men,  Album 2005 Bang! Records, Butcher's Hook Records (released on vinyl through Bang! Records as 'El Peligro ha Comenzado')
 The Great Charade, 7" Single 2001 Pitshark Records
 Fratricide/Swept Back 7" Single 1999 007 Records
 Prosody (Re-issue), Album 2005 Bang! Records

Compilations
 Anglo Girl Desire, Flattery Radio Birdman Tribute Vol 2, 2000 Get Hip Records

In popular culture

Songs originally written and recorded by The Yes-Men have been covered by Swedish band The Hellacopters who included a version of Acid Reign as part of the digital only version of their last album Head off in 2008. Australian band Leadfinger recorded Swept Back (By the Tide) in 2008 and Leaving was included on their 2011 album, We Make the Music.

References

General
  Note: Archived [on-line] copy has limited functionality.

Specific

 Stranded: The Secret History of Australian Independent Music 1977-1991, Clinton Walker, Pan MacMillan, 1996, .

External links
https://www.youtube.com/watch?v=8Mil1Zdzge0&list=UU6qo3HG2PCV8JjmV-Po3F_g (The Yes-Men - Live in 2000)
http://sonsofthedolls.blogspot.com.au/2012/05/yes-men-yes-men.html 
http://sonsofthedolls.blogspot.com.au/2012/05/yes-men-prosody.html 
https://myspace.com/yesmenrock 
http://www.leadfinger.com.au
https://www.facebook.com/godrock
 God (Australian band)
https://www.youtube.com/watch?v=e8Jfl1jC2dw (Hellacopters - Acid Reign)

Musical groups established in 1995
Australian punk rock groups
Australian indie rock groups
Australian post-grunge groups
Musical groups from Melbourne